Choi Sun-Hyung (born August 29, 1970) is a South Korean sprint canoer who competed in the late 1980s. At the 1988 Summer Olympics in Seoul, she was eliminated in the repechages of the K-2 500 m event while being eliminated in the semifinals of the K-4 500 m event.

External links
Sports-reference.com profile

1970 births
Canoeists at the 1988 Summer Olympics
Living people
Olympic canoeists of South Korea
South Korean female canoeists
Asian Games medalists in canoeing
Canoeists at the 1994 Asian Games
Medalists at the 1994 Asian Games
Asian Games silver medalists for South Korea